Sar Jowshar-e Ahhad (also Romanized as Sar Jowshar-e Aḩḩad) is a village in Tashan-e Sharqi Rural District, Tashan District, Behbahan County, Khuzestan Province, Iran. At the 2006 census, its population was 52, in 11 families.

References 

Populated places in Behbahan County